Sonchus brachyotus is an Asian species of plant in the tribe Cichorieae within the family Asteraceae. It is widespread across much of northern Asia, found in Japan, Korea, China, Russia, Mongolia, Thailand, Kazakhstan, Caucasus, Kyrgyzstan, etc.

Sonchus brachyotus is a perennial herb up to 100 cm tall. It produces flat-topped arrays of several flower heads, each head with 170-300 yellow ray flowers but no disc flowers. It grows on grassy slopes on mountains and alongside rivers.

References

brachyotus
Flora of temperate Asia
Flora of tropical Asia
Indomalayan realm flora
Plants described in 1838
Taxa named by Augustin Pyramus de Candolle